La Désirade Airport  is an airport serving La Désirade, the easternmost island of Guadeloupe.

The airport is on the south shore, with water off both ends, and high terrain to the northeast.

See also

Transport in Guadeloupe
List of airports in Guadeloupe

References

External links
OpenStreetMap - La Désirade
OurAirports - La Désirade
SkyVector - La Désirade

Airports in Guadeloupe